Sonny Cox may refer to:
 Sonny Cox (basketball), American basketball coach and jazz alto saxophonist
 Sonny Cox (footballer), English footballer